West Union Township may refer to one of the following places in the United States:

 West Union Township, Todd County, Minnesota
 West Union Township, Custer County, Nebraska

See also

 West Township (disambiguation)

Township name disambiguation pages